Strone is a small hamlet in the administrative county of the Scottish Highland and in the historic county of Inverness-shire. It lies on the foot of the hill, Creag na h-Iolaire in Glen Urquhart in the Great Glen. The nearest town is Drumnadrochit and Urquhart Castle lies nearby.

The hamlet is often confused with the village of Strone in Argyll and Bute.

References 

Hamlets in Scotland
Populated places in Highland (council area)